Daniel Rehák (born 2 April 1985 in Slovakia) is a Slovak defender who currently plays for FK Slovan Duslo Šaľa. He is  a former Slovakia U-21 international.

He came through the ranks of FK Slovan Duslo Šaľa of the Slovak 2nd Division and caught the eye  of top Czech club Slovan Liberec with his impressive performances. They signed the 21-year-old international in 2006. After finding it hard to establish himself in the first team and making only 1 substitute appearance in the league he went on loan to České Budějovice. However, he spent his loan spell on the bench and playing for the 'B' side before returning to Liberec.
He was released by the club in 2010 and joined FK Fotbal Třinec to get first team football.

References

External links

1985 births
Living people
Slovak footballers
Association football defenders
FK Slovan Duslo Šaľa players
FC Slovan Liberec players
SK Dynamo České Budějovice players
FK Fotbal Třinec players
Czech First League players
Expatriate footballers in the Czech Republic